The Weather Station is the eponymous fourth studio album by Canadian band the Weather Station. It was released on October 6, 2017 through Paradise of Bachelors.

The album was a Juno Award nominee for Contemporary Roots Album of the Year at the Juno Awards of 2018.

Reception

Accolades

Track listing

References

2017 albums
The Weather Station albums